The Neonatal Resuscitation Program is an educational program in neonatal resuscitation that was developed and is maintained by the American Academy of Pediatrics.  This program focuses on basic resuscitation skills for newly born infants.

With the rollout of the seventh edition of the Neonatal Resuscitation Program to reflect the 2016 American Academy of Pediatrics  guidelines for resuscitation, the course format has changed considerably. In the past, a full-day course incorporated lecture, written testing and hands-the classroom time required for the course and allows instructors to focus on the practical skills needed to resuscitate the neonate. The program is intended for healthcare providers who perform resuscitation in the delivery room or newborn nursery.  Providers who take the Neonatal Resuscitation Program are diverse in their scope of practice. The course outline is flexible to allow providers to complete specific modules directly related to their practice.


Lesson modules
 Overview and principles of resuscitation
 Initial steps in resuscitation
 Use of resuscitation devices for positive-pressure ventilation
 Chest compressions
 Tracheal intubation
 Medication
 Special considerations
 Resuscitation of babies born pre-term
 Ethics and care at the end of life

References

Medical credentials
Emergency medical procedures
Emergency medicine courses
Emergency life support
United States
Cardiopulmonary resuscitation